Tha Blaqprint is the second studio album by American hip hop recording artist Blaq Poet, released June 30, 2009 on DJ Premier's record label Year Round Records via Fat Beats Records. It features guest appearances by the also Year Round Records signed group NYGz and Nick Javas, Capone-N-Noreaga member N.O.R.E., Imani Montana, Lil' Fame from M.O.P., and the late Screwball member KL. The album was entirely produced by DJ Premier, except for two tracks: "U Phucc’d Up", produced by Easy Mo Bee, and "Sichuwayshunz", produced by Gemcrates.
Several tracks have been released on various mixtapes, such as "Blaq Out" or "No Talent Required", dating all the way back to 2006. The album's lead single, "Ain't Nuttin' Changed", has been released in February 2009. There's also a remix version to the single, released in June 2009. It features verses by MC Eiht from Compton's Most Wanted and Young Maylay from Ice Cube's Lench Mob Records.

Track list CD 1
All songs produced by DJ Premier, except for track 2 by Easy Mo Bee and track 9 by Gemcrates

Track list CD 2 (instrumentals)
All songs produced by DJ Premier, except for track 2 by Easy Mo Bee and track 9 by Gemcrates

Albums produced by DJ Premier
Albums produced by Easy Mo Bee
Blaq Poet albums
2009 albums